Adam Smith is currently serving as the Sporting Director for USL League 1 team, Central Valley Fuego FC.  Prior to joining Fuego, Smith took the role of CEO and Director of Football at USL League 2 team Ventura County Fusion.  Fusion had previously been on a two-year hiatus from the league due to Covid shutdowns but they re-entered in a strong fashion, winning the 2022 National Championship.  They beat Long Island Rough Riders in regulation time at Ventura College.  Long Island Rough Riders is co-incidentally the first team that Smith ever signed for in the United States as a professional player. During the 2021 season, Smith took an interim position as First Team Head Coach at Detroit City FC. This was to provide short-term help to the current Head Coach and General manager of the Club, Trevor James.  Detroit went onto win the NISA Legends tournament that same season.

Smith, originally from England but now a US Citizen, is a football coach and former goalkeeper who was also the inaugural Head Coach of USL Championship side Fresno FC. Smith took the team to 3rd place in the USL Championship Western Conference in only its 2nd season in the league. This was Smith's first Head Managerial position of a Senior Team (aside from two interim games with Sacramento Republic). Unfortunately, after the successful first two years, the Fresno FC ownership group decided to cease operations at the end of the 2019 season. This was for non-soccer related matters and was in part due to not being able to secure a soccer specific stadium.

Before joining Fresno, Smith was formerly the Assistant Head Coach at Sacramento Republic, helping the club achieve a USL Championship 1st place Western Conference finish in 2016 with then Head Coach, Paul Buckle. Smith spent three years at the Club, initially under the team's first Head Coach, Predrag Radosavljević (Preki). Prior to working under Preki, Smith served under John Spencer at Portland Timbers where he became the inaugural Goalkeeping Coach for the teams' first year in Major League Soccer. Smith later went on to be the club's first Academy Director, and was responsible for helping to build the Clubs first Academy Teams and the Timbers Alliance program. After serving five years with the MLS Club, he moved to return to first team professional football with Sacramento at the start of the 2015 season.

Career

Playing career
Smith, who played as goalkeeper, began his professional playing career in 1992 after graduating from Manchester Metropolitan University in England, with a degree in business and sports coaching. Smith was a school boy player at Everton FC of the EPL and signed his first contract with Walsall FC of the EFL. Smith also represented England Independent Schoolboys at both the U16 and U19 levels. Additionally, he represented a British Colleges X1 in 1992. Smith did not make a professional league full appearance but was able to ply his trade in non-league football (making over 200 first team semi-professional appearances in England and Wales). He then went on work in the US as a full-time professional, playing in the second division league (A league and USL Pro) initially for Long Island Rough Riders and then Wilmington Hammerheads, winning back-to-back USL National Championships in 2002 and 2003 respectively.

Personal life
Smith lives in California with his wife and two children. Smith also gained professional playing experience in England, Scotland, Wales and South East Asia before moving permanently to the United States. He has over 30 years of domestic and international experience at many different levels and roles within the game. Prior to working full-time in professional soccer, Smith worked as a financial advisor after completing his college degree. During his part-time professional playing, he worked for a large insurance company and then a national banking institution. He is the son of Graham Smith, an ex-professional English footballer who was previously a director at Chelsea of the English Premier League and then prior owner of the successful player agency First Wave Sports. Graham Smith has had over 200 English league appearances as a professional player and was able to help build Sacramento Republic to a Championship winning team as the club's first ever Director of Football.

Honors
 Playing

 USL National Championship winner, Long island Rough Riders, 2002
 USL National Championship winner, Wilmington Hammerheads, 2003

 Coaching

 USL PDL National Championship winner, Portland Timbers u23s, 2010
 USL playoffs 2nd place Western conference, Portland Timbers, 2010
 Cascadia Cup winner, Portland Timbers, 2010
 MLS Goalkeeper player of the year (Troy Perkins), Portland Timbers, 2011
 MLS Reserve Team 2nd place position, Portland Timbers, 2011
 USL Western conference playoffs, Sacramento Republic, 2015
 USL 1st place Western conference, Sacramento Republic, 2016
 US Open Cup round of 16, Sacramento Republic, 2017
 USL Western conference semi-finals, Sacramento Republic, 2017
 US Open Cup 4th round v LAFC, Fresno FC, 2018
 USL Western Conference 3rd place, Fresno FC, 2019
 Nomination for USL Championship Coach of the Year, 2019
 Nisa legends tournament winner, Detroit City FC, 2021
 USL League 2 National Champion, Ventura Fusion, 2022

Coaching qualifications
Uefa A license (Welsh Football Association)

English Preliminary Award (English FA)

USSF A license (US Soccer)

USSF National GK license (US Soccer)

USSF Pro B license (US Soccer)

NSCAA National GK License (Utd Soccer coaches)

NSCAA Director of Coaching (Utd Soccer coaches)

References

Living people
Sports in Fresno, California
Fresno FC coaches
1971 births
English football managers
Mold Alexandra F.C. players
Holywell Town F.C. players
Alumni of Manchester Metropolitan University
Harrogate Town A.F.C. players
Association football goalkeepers
Soham Town Rangers F.C. players
Long Island Rough Riders players
Wilmington Hammerheads FC players
Geylang International FC players
Los Angeles Salsa players
Walsall F.C. players
Motherwell F.C. players
Expatriate soccer players in the United States
Expatriate footballers in Singapore